Vincent Tsui (崔允信) is one of the few independent film directors in Hong Kong. He starts his filming career in As Time Goes By (1997), a documentary film he co-directed with Ann Hui.

Leaving in Sorrow (2001), starring Shawn Yue, which adopted the style of Dogma 95, also gained critical acclaim. His Love is Elsewhere premiered at the 2008 Hong Kong International Film Festival.

On April 29, 2011, Chui's new short film 《你還可愛麼》 佳叔 was posted on YouTube as part of the "Love More HK"/"你還可愛麼" project.

He is also one of the founder of non-profit film organization Ying e Chi.

References

External links
 
 《你還可愛麼》 佳叔
 《你還可愛麼》 佳叔 製作花絮

Year of birth missing (living people)
Living people
Hong Kong film directors